Scutellaria sarmentosa is a species of flowering plant in the family Lamiaceae. It is found only in Ecuador. Its natural habitat is subtropical or tropical moist montane forests.

References

sarmentosa
Flora of Ecuador
Vulnerable plants
Taxonomy articles created by Polbot